The Common Touch is a 1941 British drama film directed by John Baxter and starring Geoffrey Hibbert, Harry Welchman, Greta Gynt, and Joyce Howard. The film is a remake by the director of his 1933 film Doss House.

Pianist Mark Hambourg appears in a small role.

Plot
At the age of 18 Peter Henderson is orphaned and has to leave school in the middle of the term (after winning a cricket match) to take over the father's firm, "Henderson's", one of the most important in the City of London. The directors are shocked by his youth. Cartwright, one of the company directors, tries to retain control of the decision-making, but Peter follows his father's explicit instructions to learn about the business.

One day, Peter asks an employee about what occupies a certain city block his firm wants to demolish. (Cartwright and his cronies are secretly trying to enrich themselves.) The man tells him about Charlie's, a dosshouse. Peter and a former schoolmate disguise themselves as down-and-outs to look the place over. While they are there, Charlie notifies everyone that the establishment will be closing soon, as it and the neighbouring tenements will be demolished by the firm which owns the block.

Inky, one of the residents, consults lawyer "Lincoln's Inn". He has kept away from his beautiful daughter, cabaret performer Sylvia Meadows, because of his forgery and blackmailing past. He thinks he is the reason Sylvia has not married noted cricketer Stuart Gordon; Lincoln agrees to see what he can do. Peter eavesdrops when Charlie consults with Lincoln, and learns that Cartwright is involved in the eviction and is coming to Charlie's tomorrow.

Inky sends a letter to his daughter via Peter, which he delivers at a cricket match, but she does not believe her father can keep his word, as he has been previously unable to do so. When Inky is told, that she remains scared that any husband will discover Inky's criminal past, he commits suicide. He leaves behind a letter for Lincoln's Inn which reveals that he forged the signature of John Henderson on a document on behalf of Cartwright, which he believes has something to do with the closing of Charlie's. However, Lincoln states they need to get their hands on some of Cartwright's papers as corroboration. 

Peter takes Tich, a former safe-breaker, to Cartwright's apartment and break into his safe while Mary keeps him occupied with flattery. With the relevant document obtained, Peter informs Charlie's residents that his company will rebuild a new and better Charlie's.

Cast
 Geoffrey Hibbert as Peter Henderson
 Harry Welchman as "Lincoln's Inn"
 Greta Gynt as Sylvia Meadows
 Joyce Howard as Mary
Edward Rigby as "Tich" the manager of the dosshouse
Bransby Williams as Ben
George Carney as Charlie who runs the dosshouse
Eliot Makeham as "Inky"
Mark Hambourg as "Chopin"
 Paul Martin as Chris
Raymond Lovell as Cartwright
John Longden as Stuart Gordon
Wally Patch as "Nobby"
Edgar Driver as "Oily"
Bernard Miles as Cricket Steward
 Scott Sanders as Pat
Ian Maclaren as Harmonica Player (as Sydney Shaw)
Jerry Verno as Office Messenger Sandy Macpherson as himself.  
 Iris Vandeleur as Alice 
Listed in opening, but not closing credits:
 Charles Carson as Haywood [Henderson's butler]
 Ben Williams as Workman watching cricket match
 John Slater as Joe
 Bill Fraser as Harris
 John Turnbull as Father at cricket match
 Marian Spencer as Mother at cricket match
 Grant Tyler as Son at cricket match
 Dennis Wyndham as Commissionaire
 Hector Abbas as Foreigner

There is also an appearance by Carroll Gibbons the bandleader.

References

External links
 

1941 films
1941 drama films
British black-and-white films
British drama films
1940s English-language films
Films set in London
Films shot at British National Studios
1940s British films